Dogar (also Romanized as Do Gar; also known as Do Gol) is a village in Rudbar Rural District, Sirvan District, Sirvan County, Ilam Province, Iran. At the 2006 census, its population was 47, in 10 families. The village is populated by Kurds.

References 

Populated places in Sirvan County
Kurdish settlements in Ilam Province